Leocán Portus (May 15, 1923 – November 25, 2006) was a Chilean politician, leader of social organizations, militant of the Falange and a founder of the Christian Democratic Party (PDC) .

1923 births
2006 deaths
People from Antofagasta